Amaigbo is a large town in Imo State, Nigeria. It is the headquarters of Nwangele Local Government Area. Amaigbo is regarded by many historians as the cradle of Igbo civilization. 

The town has an official post office.

Notable people

Chief Dr. Walter Ofonagoro of Umuobi - former Minister of Information and Culture (Federal Republic of Nigeria) and former Director-General of the Nigerian Television Authority
King Jaja of Opobo - sold into slavery in pre-colonial Nigeria
Dick Tiger - late boxer
Chuma Mmeka - actor, poet, writer, humanitarian and child protection expert
Pastor Chidi Ezimako-Pastor, tele evangelist

References

Towns in Imo State